Giuliano Teatino is a comune and town in the province of Chieti in the Abruzzo region of Italy. It is located on a hill between the streams Venna and Dendalo, tributaries of the Foro River, and is a medieval burgh dating from the 11th century. It was a fief, among the others, of the Orsini and the Caracciolo.

Notes

Cities and towns in Abruzzo